Beryl Hughes (née Jarman, 1931 – 13 November 2017) was a Welsh chess player and writer, two-times Welsh Women's Chess Championship winner (1975, 1999).

Biography
Beryl Hughes was educated at Dursley Grammar School in Gloucestershire and Cardiff University. In the 1970s she was one of the best chess female player in Wales. She has twice won Welsh Women's Chess Championship in 1975 and 1999.

Beryl Hughes played for Wales in the Chess Olympiad:
 In 1976, at first reserve board in the 7th Chess Olympiad (women) in Haifa (+0, =0, -4).

In 2013, Beryl Hughes published a book about identity of Shakespeare’s friends – Shakespeare's Friends Revealed.

References

External links

Beryl Hughes chess games at 365chess.com

1931 births
2017 deaths
People from Rhondda
Alumni of Cardiff University
21st-century Welsh women writers
Welsh chess players
Chess Olympiad competitors